Union Lake may refer to:

Union Lake (Polk County, Minnesota)
Union Lake (Rice County, Minnesota)
Union Lake, Michigan, an unincorporated community
Union Lake (Michigan), a lake
Union Lake, also known as Swains Lake in New Hampshire

See also
Lake Union, Seattle, Washington